Fiederer is a German-language occupational surname analogous to the English "Fletcher". It may refer to:
Hans Fiederer (1920–1980), German international footballer
Leo Fiederer (1897–1946), German international footballer

References 

German-language surnames
Occupational surnames